Al-Ghurfah is a small town in east-central Yemen, located just east of Shibam. It is located in the Hadhramaut Governorate. According to the 2004 census it had a population of 5,006 people. The 2009 estimate for the town is 5,700.

References

Populated places in Hadhramaut Governorate